Cucullia is a genus of moths of the family Noctuidae. The genus was erected by Franz von Paula Schrank in 1802.

Species

 Cucullia absinthii Linnaeus, 1761
 Cucullia achilleae Guenée, 1852
 Cucullia aksuana Draudt, 1935
 Cucullia albida Smith, 1894
 Cucullia albilineata Gaede, 1934
 Cucullia albipennis Hampson, 1894
 Cucullia alfarata Strecker, 1898
 Cucullia amota Alphéraky, 1887
 Cucullia anthocharis Boursin, 1969
 Cucullia antipoda Strecker, 1877
 Cucullia aplana Viette, 1958
 Cucullia apo Ronkay, Varga & Hreblay, 1998
 Cucullia argentea Hufnagel, 1766
 Cucullia argentilinea (Gaede, 1934)
 Cucullia argentina Fabricius, 1787
 Cucullia argentivitta (Hampson, 1906)
 Cucullia artemisiae Hufnagel, 1766
 Cucullia asteris Denis & Schiffermüller, 1775 - star-wort
 Cucullia asteroides Guenée, 1852
 Cucullia astigma Smith, 1894
 Cucullia balsamitae Boisduval, 1840
 Cucullia basipuncta Barnes & McDunnough, 1918
 Cucullia behouneki Hacker & Ronkay, 1988
 Cucullia bensi Agenjo, 1952
 Cucullia biornata Fischer von Waldheim, 1840
 Cucullia biradiata Kozhanchikov, 1925
 Cucullia biskrana Oberthür, 1918
 Cucullia boryphora Fischer von Waldheim, 1840
 Cucullia bubaceki Kitt, 1925
 Cucullia calendulae Treitschke, 1835
 Cucullia campanulae Freyer, 1831
 Cucullia capazi Agenjo, 1952
 Cucullia cemenelensis Boursin, 1923
 Cucullia chamomillae Denis & Schiffermüller, 1775 - chamomille shark
 Cucullia charon Poole, 1995
 Cucullia chrysota Hampson, 1902
 Cucullia cineracea Freyer, 1841
 Cucullia citella Ronkay & Ronkay, 1988
 Cucullia comstocki (McDunnough, 1937)
 Cucullia convexipennis Grote & Robinson, 1868
 Cucullia cucullioides Barnes & Benjamin, 1923
 Cucullia dallolmoi Berio, 1973
 Cucullia dammersi (McDunnough, 1935)
 Cucullia dimorpha Staudinger, 1896
 Cucullia dorsalis Smith, 1892
 Cucullia dracunculi Hübner, 1813
 Cucullia draudti Boursin, 1942
 Cucullia duplicata Staudinger, 1882
 Cucullia eccissica Dyar, 1919
 Cucullia elongata Butler, 1880
 Cucullia embolina Püngeler, 1906
 Cucullia ennatae (Laporte, 1984)
 Cucullia eucaena Dyar, 1919
 Cucullia eulepis Grote, 1876
 Cucullia eumorpha Alphéraky, 1893
 Cucullia eurekae Poole, 1995
 Cucullia florea Guenée, 1852
 Cucullia formosa Rogenhofer, 1860
 Cucullia fraterna Butler, 1878
 Cucullia fraudatrix Eversmann, 1837
 Cucullia fuchsiana Eversmann, 1837
 Cucullia galleti Rungs, 1972
 Cucullia generosa Staudinger, 1889
 Cucullia gnaphalii Hübner, 1813
 Cucullia graeseri Püngeler, 1901
 Cucullia gricescens Leech, 1900
 Cucullia hannemanni Varga, 1976
 Cucullia hartigi Ronkay & Ronkay, 1988
 Cucullia heinickei Boursin, 1968
 Cucullia heinrichi Barnes & Benjamin, 1924
 Cucullia hemidiaphana Graeser, 1892
 Cucullia hostilis Boursin, 1934
 Cucullia humilis Boursin, 1942
 Cucullia hutchinsoni Hampson, 1902
 Cucullia ikondae Berio, 1973
 Cucullia implicata Ronkay & Ronkay, 1987
 Cucullia improba Christoph, 1885
 Cucullia incresa Smith, 1910
 Cucullia inderiensis Herrich-Schäffer, 1855
 Cucullia infernalis Boursin, 1942
 Cucullia intermedia Speyer, 1870
 Cucullia jakesi Ronkay & Ronkay, 1988
 Cucullia jankowskii Oberthür, 1884
 Cucullia khorassana Brandt, 1941
 Cucullia kurilullia Bryk, 1942
 Cucullia lactea Fabricius, 1787
 Cucullia lactucae Denis & Schiffermüller, 1775
 Cucullia laetifica Lintner, 1875
 Cucullia ledereri Staudinger, 1892
 Cucullia lethe Poole, 1995
 Cucullia lilacina Schaus, 1898
 Cucullia lindei Heyne, 1899
 Cucullia lucifuga Denis & Schiffermüller, 1775
 Cucullia luna Morrison, 1875
 Cucullia macara Rebel, 1947
 Cucullia maculosa Staudinger, 1888
 Cucullia magdalenae (Laporte, 1976)
 Cucullia magnifica Freyer, 1839
 Cucullia malagassa Viette, 1958
 Cucullia mandschruriae Oberthür, 1884
 Cucullia maracandica Staudinger, 1888
 Cucullia marci Ronkay & Ronkay, 1988
 Cucullia marmorea Boursin, 1942
 Cucullia mcdunnoughi Henne, 1940
 Cucullia melanoglossa Berio, 1934
 Cucullia melli Boursin, 1942
 Cucullia minuta Möschler, 1884
 Cucullia mixta Freyer, 1841
 Cucullia montanae Grote, 1882
 Cucullia naruenensis Staudinger, 1879
 Cucullia nigrifascia Hampson, 1894
 Cucullia nokra Rungs, 1952
 Cucullia omissa Dod, 1916
 Cucullia opacographa Ronkay & Ronkay, 1986
 Cucullia oribac Barnes, 1904
 Cucullia pallidistria Felder & Rogenhofer, 1874
 Cucullia papoka Ronkay & Ronkay, 1986
 Cucullia perforata Bremer, 1864
 Cucullia petrophila Ronkay, Varga & Hreblay, 1998
 Cucullia phocylides Druce, 1889
 Cucullia pittawayi Wiltshire, 1987
 Cucullia platinea Ronaky & Ronkay, 1987
 Cucullia postera Guenée, 1852
 Cucullia praecana Eversmann, 1844
 Cucullia prolai Berio, 1956
 Cucullia propinqua Eversmann, 1842
 Cucullia pseudumbratica Boursin, 1942
 Cucullia pulla (Grote, 1881)
 Cucullia pullata Moore, 1881
 Cucullia pusilla Möschler, 1884
 Cucullia pyrostrota Hampson, 1906
 Cucullia retecta Püngeler, 1901
 Cucullia retectina Ronkay & Ronkay, 1987
 Cucullia ruficeps Hampson, 1906
 Cucullia sabulosa Staudinger, 1879
 Cucullia santolinae Rambur, 1834
 Cucullia santonici Hübner, [1813]
 Cucullia scopariae Dorfmeister, 1853
 Cucullia scoparioides Boursin, 1942
 Cucullia serraticornis Lintner, 1874
 Cucullia similaris J. B. Smith, 1892
 Cucullia simoneuai Laporte, 1976
 Cucullia spectabilisoides Poole, 1989
 Cucullia speyeri Lintner, 1874
 Cucullia splendida Stoll, 1782
 Cucullia strigata (Smith, 1892)
 Cucullia styx Poole, 1995
 Cucullia subgrisea Ronkay & Ronkay, 1986
 Cucullia sublutea Graeser, 1892
 Cucullia syrtana Mabille, 1888
 Cucullia tanaceti Denis & Schiffermüller, 1775
 Cucullia tecca Püngeler, 1906
 Cucullia tedjicolora Laporte, 1977
 Cucullia tescorum Püngeler, 1909
 Cucullia tiefi Tshetverikov, 1956
 Cucullia tosca Bang-Haas, 1912
 Cucullia tristis Boursin, 1934
 Cucullia turkestana Ronkay & Ronkay, 1987
 Cucullia umbistriga Alphéraky, 1892
 Cucullia umbratica Linnaeus, 1758 - shark
 Cucullia verbasci (Linnaeus, 1758) - mullein moth
 Cucullia vicina Bang-Haas, 1912
 Cucullia virgaureae Boisduval, 1840
 Cucullia xeranthemi Boisduval, 1840
 Cucullia xerophila Ronkay, Varga & Hreblay, 1998

Former species
 Cucullia dentilinea is now Dolocucullia dentilinea (Smith, 1899)
 Cucullia minor is now Dolocucullia minor (Barnes & McDunnough, 1913)
 Cucullia obtusa is now Supralathosea obtusa J. B. Smith, 1909

Cucullia gallery

Imagines

Larvae

References

 
Taxa named by Franz von Paula Schrank